Tobias Heintz (born 13 July 1998) is a Norwegian footballer who plays for CSKA Sofia. He started his career in his local club Moss FK, before joining crosstown rivals SK Sprint-Jeløy. He made his senior debut for Sprint-Jeløy in 2014 before joining Sarpsborg 08. He signed for the Turkish team Kasimpasa for 1 mil euro plus add ons early January 2019.

He made his Eliteserien debut in July 2016 against Lillestrøm SK. In September, in his first game in the starting lineup in Eliteserien, he scored his first goal for Sarpsborg 08 against Bodø/Glimt.

Career statistics

Club

References

1998 births
Living people
Norwegian footballers
Norway youth international footballers
Norwegian expatriate footballers
Eliteserien players
Süper Lig players
Allsvenskan players
Sarpsborg 08 FF players
SK Sprint-Jeløy players
Kasımpaşa S.K. footballers
BK Häcken players
PFC CSKA Sofia players
Association football midfielders
People from Moss, Norway
Expatriate footballers in Turkey
Norwegian expatriate sportspeople in Turkey
Expatriate footballers in Sweden
Norwegian expatriate sportspeople in Sweden
First Professional Football League (Bulgaria) players
Sportspeople from Viken (county)